The Opium Law (or Opiumwet in Dutch) is the section of the Dutch law which covers nearly all psychotropic drugs.

Origin and history 
In 1912, the First International Opium Conference took place in The Hague, where agreements were made about the trade in opium; this initiated the introduction of the Opium Law, which took place 7 years later. In 1919, the first Opium Law (later known as List I of the Opium Law) was introduced, and on 12 May 1928 the second Opium Law (later known as List II of the Opium Law) was introduced. The first Opium Law was created to regulate drugs with a high addiction or abuse factor, or that are physically harmful. As the name indicates the main reason for introduction was to regulate the Opium trade and later to control various other addictive drugs like morphine, cocaine, heroin, barbiturates, amphetamines and several decades later, benzodiazapines, which were used both medically and recreationally.

Except for the addition of new drugs to List I and II of the Opium Law, the Opium Law remained unchanged until 1976. After the rise of a new youth culture which revolved much around the use of drugs like cannabis and LSD, and with hashish being openly used, a change of law was needed by the government, to properly control all drugs, but with a clear definition between drugs with an unacceptable degree of addictiveness or physical harm (known as hard drugs), and drugs with an acceptable degree of addictiveness or physical harm (known as soft drugs).  In 1976 these changes officially took effect, and the Opium Law was edited to include the changes in the law. In the same year, a decision was made by the Dutch government to discontinue prosecuting cannabis and hashish offenses, provided the person did not sell hard drugs, did not advertise and carried less than a specified maximum amount of cannabis or hashish.

In 1980, the decision to not prosecute cannabis and hashish dealers, under certain conditions, was publicly announced by the Dutch government.  Many people thereby concluded that this decision would also allow the sale in coffee shops, and coffee shops began selling cannabis and hashish. This led to an enormous rise in the number of coffee shops in the 80's and 90's, and because of this, new regulations were demanded by the government to regulate the sale of cannabis products by coffee shops. In 1996 the laws were changed again to include new regulations for coffee shops. The terms coffee shops had to follow were:
 No advertisement
 No hard drugs
 No entrance to coffee shops by persons under the age of 18
 No sale of more than 5 grams of cannabis products per person, per day
 Coffee shops are not allowed to have more than 500 grams of cannabis in stock at any time

Since 01-01-2020, no new changes have been made to the Opium Law. Most of the changes in law since 1996 have been additions of new psychoactive substances, ADB-FUBINACA has been one of the latest on this list being added on 01-01-2020. New guidelines for coffee shops have been made, but they are not covered by the Opium Law.

List I drugs 
The following drugs and intermediates are classified as List I drugs of the Opium Law:

 acetorphine
 acetyl-alpha-methylfentanyl
 acetyldihydrocodeine
 acetylmethadol
 alphacetylmethadol
 alphameprodine
 alphamethadol
 alphamethylfentanyl
 alphamethylthiofentanyl
 alphaprodine
 alfentanil
 allylprodine
 amphetamine
 amineptine
 anileridine
 benzethidine
 benzylmorphine
 betacetylmethadol
 beta-hydroxy-3-methylfentanyl
 beta-hydroxyfentanyl
 betameprodine
 betamethadol
 betaprodine
 bezitramide
 bolkaf (all parts of the papaver somniferum plant, after harvesting, excluding seeds)
 brolamphetamine
 cathinone
 2C-B (2,5-dimethoxy-4-bromophenethylamine)
 2C-I (2,5-dimethoxy-4-iodophenethylamine)
 2C-T-2 (2,5-dimethoxy-4-ethylthiophenethylamine)
 2C-T-7 (2,5-dimethoxy-4-(n)-propylthiophenethylamine)
 clonitazene
 coca leaf (leaves of the plants of the species Erythroxylon)
 cocaine
 codeine
 codoxime
 concentrate of bolkaf (the material obtained by subjecting bolkaf to a treatment for the concentration of its alkaloids)
 desomorphine
 dexamphetamine
 dextromoramide
 dextropropoxyphene
 diampromide
 diethylthiambutene
 DET (N,N-diethyltryptamine)
 diphenoxide
 diphenoxylate
 dihydrocodeine
 dihydroetorphine
 dihydromorphine
 dimepheptanol
 dimenoxadol
 DMA (2,5-dimethoxyamphetamine)
 DOET (2,5-dimethoxy-4-ethylamphetamine)
 DOM (2,5-dimethoxy-4-methylamphetamine)
 dimethylthiambutene
 DMT (N,N-dimethyltryptamine)
 dioxaphetylbutyrate
 dipipanone
 DMHP (1,2-dimethylheptyl-delta-3-THC)
 drotebanol
 ecgonine (3-hydroxy-2-tropanecarbonic acid)
 MDEA (N-ethyl-3,4-methylenedioxyamphetamine)
 ethylmethylthiambutene
 ethylmorphine
 eticyclidine
 etonitazene
 etorphine
 etoxeridine
 etryptamine
 fentanyl
 fenethylline
 furethidine
 GHB (4-hydroxybutyric acid)
 hemp oil (concentrate of plants from the Cannabis species (hemp) obtained by extraction of hemp or hashish, if not mixed with oil)
 heroin (diamorphine)
 hydrocodone
 hydromorphinol
 hydromorphone
 MDOH (N-hydroxy-methylenedioxyamphetamine)
 hydroxypethidine
 isomethadone
 ketobemidone
 levamphetamine
 levophenacylmorphan
 levomethamphetamine
 levomethorphan
 levomoramide
 levorphanol
 lysergide
 mecloqualone
 mescaline (3,4,5-trimethoxyphenethylamine)
 methamphetamine
 methamphetamine racemate
 metazocine
 methadone
 methadone intermediate (4-cyano-2-dimethylamino-4,4-diphenylbutane)
 methaqualone
 methcathinone
 MMDA (2-methoxy-4,5-methylenedioxyamphetamine)
 4-methylaminorex
 methyldesorphine
 methyldihydromorphine
 MDMA (3,4-methylenedioxymethamphetamine)
 methylphenidate
 3-methylfentanyl
 MPPP (1-methyl-4-phenyl-4-piperidinol propionate ester)
 4-MTA (4-methylthioamphetamine)
 3-methylthiofentanyl
 metopon
 moramide intermediate (2-methyl-3-morpholino-1,1-diphenylpropane-carboxylic acid)
 morpheridine
 morphine
 morphine-methobromide
 morphine-N-oxide
 myrophine
 nicocodeine
 nicodicodine
 nicomorphine
 noracymethadol
 norcodeine
 norlevorphanol
 normethadone
 normorphine
 norpipanone
 opium (the harvested milk, obtained from the plant Papaver somniferum)
 oxycodone
 oxymorphone
 para-fluorofentanyl
 parahexyl
 PMA (para-methoxyamphetamine)
 PMMA (para-methoxymethamphetamine)
 PEPAP (1-fenethyl-4-fenyl-4-piperidinolacetate ester)
 pethidine
 pethidine Intermediate A (4-cyano-1-methyl-4-phenylpiperidine)
 pethidine Intermediate B (4-phenylpiperidine-4-carbonic acid ethylester)
 pethidine Intermediate C (1-methyl-4-phenylpiperidine-4-carbonic acid)
 phenadoxone
 phenampromide
 phenazocine
 phencyclidine
 phenmetrazine
 phenomorphan
 phenoperidine
 pholcodine
 piminodine
 piritramide
 proheptazine
 properidine
 propiram
 psilocine
 psilocybine
 racemethorphan
 racemoramide
 racemorphan
 remifentanil
 rolicyclidine
 secobarbital
 sufentanil
 temazepam†
 tenamphetamine
 tenocyclidine
 tetrahydrocannabinol
 thebacon
 thebaïne
 thiofentanyl
 tilidine	
 TMA-2 (2,4,5-trimethoxyamphetamine)
 trimeperidine
 TMA (3,4,5-trimethoxyamfetamine)
 zipeprol

The esters and derivatives of ecgonine, which can be turned into ecgonine and cocaine;

The mono- and di-alkylamide-, the pyrrolidine- and morpholine derivatives of lysergic acid, and the thereby introduction of methyl-, acetyl- or halogen groups obtained substances;

Fiveworthy nitrogen-substituted morphinederivates, of which morphine-N-oxide-derivatives, like codeine-N-oxide;

The isomers and stereoisomers of tetrahydrocannabinol;

The ethers, esters and enantiomers of the above mentioned substances, with exception of dextromethorphan (INN) as enantiomer of levomethorphan and racemethorphan, and with exception of dextrorphanol (INN) as enantiomere of levorphanol and racemorphan;

Formulations which contain one or more of the above mentioned substances.

†Formulations of 20 mg or more of temazepam are classed under List I.

List II drugs 
The following drugs are classified as List II drugs of the Opium Law:

 allobarbital
 alprazolam
 amobarbital
 amfepramone
 aminorex
 barbital
 benzphetamine
 bromazepam
 brotizolam
 buprenorphine
 butalbital
 butobarbital
 camazepam
 cathine
 chlordiazepoxide
 clobazam
 clonazepam
 clorazepate
 clotiazepam
 cloxazolam
 cyclobarbital
 delorazepam
 diazepam
 estazolam
 ethchlorvynol
 ethinamate
 ethylloflazepate
 ethylamphetamine
 fencamfamine
 fenproporex
 fludiazepam
 flunitrazepam
 flurazepam
 glutethimide
 halazepam
 haloxazolam
 hashish (a usually solid mixture of the excreted resin obtained from plants of the Cannabis species (hemp), with plant materials of these plants)
 hemp (all parts of the plant from the Cannabis species (hemp), of which the resin has not been extracted, with exception of the seeds)
 ketazolam
 lefetamine
 loprazolam
 lorazepam
 lormetazepam
 mazindole
 medazepam
 mefenorex
 meprobamate
 mesocarb
 methylphenobarbital
 methyprylon
 midazolam
 nimetazepam
 nitrazepam
 nordiazepam
 oxazepam
 oxazolam
 pemoline
 pentazocine
 pentobarbital
 phendimetrazine
 phenobarbital
 phentermine
 pinazepam
 pipradrol
 prazepam
 pyrovalerone
 secbutabarbital
 temazepam (formulations containing less than 20 mg)
 tetrazepam
 triazolam
 vinylbital
 zolpidem

Formulations which contain one or more of the above mentioned substances, with exception of hemp oil.

Medical use 
Even though List I substances are officially classified as hard drugs, several of them are often prescribed by licensed doctors. For example, nearly all opioids are List I drugs, but they are commonly prescribed to cancer and HIV patients, as well as sufferers of chronic pain. Two stimulants which are both prescribed for ADD/ADHD and narcolepsy; dexamphetamine and methylphenidate, are also List I drugs of the Opium Law. On the other hand, all barbiturates except for secobarbital are List II drugs, while none of them, except for phenobarbital, are prescribed today. In theory, a licensed doctor could prescribe any substance they think is needed for the correct treatment of their patient, both List I and List II substances of the Opium Law, though substances which aren't available as commercial pharmaceutical preparations have to be custom prepared by the designated pharmacy.

All prescriptions for List I and some List II substances (amobarbital, buprenorphine, butalbital, cathine, cyclobarbital, flunitrazepam, temazepam, glutethimide, hemp, pentazocine and pentobarbital) of the Opium Law have to be written in full in letters, and have to contain the name and initials, address, city and telephone number of the licensed prescriber issuing the prescriptions, as well as the name and initials, address and city of the person the prescription is issued to. If the prescription is issued for an animal, the data of the owner should be used instead, and a description of the animal has to be included on the prescription.

References

External links
 Opiumwet on the official website of the Dutch government

Dutch legislation
Drug control law
Drug policy of the Netherlands
Health law in the Netherlands